Love Mates is a 1961 Swedish comedy film directed by Lars-Magnus Lindgren.

Cast 
 Jarl Kulle - Jan Froman
 Christina Schollin - Margareta Günther
 Edvin Adolphson - Viktor Günther
 Isa Quensel - Louise Günther
 Sigge Fürst - Bert Hagson
 Elsa Carlsson - The Aunt
 Gunnar Sjöberg - Karl-Evert Raeder
 George Fant - Rolf Granér
 Margit Carlqvist - Veronica von Sachs
 Åke Claesson - Torsten Waller
 Torsten Lilliecrona - Stenman, staff manager
 Börje Mellvig - Westin

References

External links 

1961 comedy films
1961 films
Films directed by Lars-Magnus Lindgren
Swedish comedy films
1960s Swedish-language films
1960s Swedish films